The 2020–21 Italian Women's Cup (Coppa Italia di calcio femminile) was the 48th edition of the Italian women's football national cup. Juventus were the defending champions from the 2018–19 season as the 2019–20 edition was not held due to the COVID-19 pandemic. The 2021 Coppa Italia was won by current holders Roma after beating Milan on penalties in the final.

Format 
The competition is contested by 24 teams at the group stage by the 12 Serie A and the top 10 Serie B clubs, a preliminary round was held for the bottom four Serie B teams (3 actually promoted from the Primavera plus the lowest ranked Serie B team in the 2019–20 season) to decide the remaining two teams in the group stages. 

The top team from each group qualifies to the knockout stage.

Calendar 
Below are the dates for each round as given by the official schedule:

Preliminary round

|}

Group stage

Group A

Group B

Group C

Group D

Group E

Group F

Group G

Group H

Knockout stage

Bracket

Quarter-finals

|}

First leg

Second leg

Semi-finals

|}

First leg

Second leg

Final

References

External links
 Coppa Italia Femminile at FIGC
 Coppa Italia Women at Soccerway

Italian Women's Cup seasons
2020–21 in Italian women's football
Wom
Italian Women's Cup